Units of frequency